Phitsanulok province, one of Thailand's seventy-six provinces, lies in lower northern Thailand. It borders Sukhothai and Uttaradit on the north, Loei and Phetchabun to the east, and Phichit and Kamphaeng Phet to the south. In the northeast it borders Laos.

Its name means 'Vishnu's heaven'. The first element, Phitsanu (Thai: พิษณุ), is a cognate of "Vishnu", a Hindu god. The second element lok (Thai: โลก) means 'globe' or 'world'.

The capital is the city of Phitsanulok.

History 

The lands of present-day Phitsanulok province were inhabited since the Stone Age, although the Neolithic inhabitants of the region are not likely to have been the ancestors of the modern Thai people who reside there today.

The earliest historical records relating to the area indicate that at a time prior to or during the 11th century, the present-day city of Phitsanulok was a small strategic Khmer outpost known as Song Khwae. During the next century, in 1188, Nakhon Thai, near the center of the present Phitsanulok province, was established as the capital city of the Singhanavati Kingdom, an early city-state of Thailand.

Later, during Thailand's Sukhothai Period, the city of Phitsanulok emerged as a major city in the east of the Sukhothai Kingdom, and the great temples of Wat Chula Manee, Wat Aranyik and Wat Chedi Yod Thong were constructed. In 1357, the renowned Wat Phra Sri Rattana Mahathat was erected, and the Ayutthaya Period witnessed the construction of several of the province's other chief temples.  Phitsanulok served for 25 years as the capital city of the Ayutthaya Kingdom. In 1555, King Naresuan the Great was born in Phitsanulok. Naresuan played a significant role in the history of Thailand, as he expanded the kingdom (then called Siam) to its greatest territorial extent by conquering sizable portions of modern-day Burma and Cambodia.

In recent times, Phitsanulok province has become an important agricultural center, part of the "bread basket of Thailand", providing rice and other crops to consumers in Thailand and throughout the world. Extensive agricultural development over the last hundred years or so has spawned a modern infrastructure in the urban areas of the province, bringing with it an array of modern roads, universities, hospitals and other conveniences. Over the years, the Nan River and its tributaries have played a substantial role in the history and development of the region by providing a route for transportation, fertile soil for agriculture, and water for irrigation. The river waters have also served as a route for enemy invaders, and have been the source of periodic widespread flooding throughout the province.

Symbols

The provincial seal depicts Phra Buddha Chinnarat, considered one of the most beautiful Buddha figures in Thailand.
The provincial flag is purple with the provincial seal in the middle of the flag.
The provincial flower is the yellow flame tree, Thai  .
The provincial animal is the Thai Bangkaew Dog, in Thai  .
The provincial mascot is the yellow white tail fighting cock, Thai  .
The provincial motto is, "Phitsanulok, a town of the excellent Phra Buddha Chinnarat, the birthplace of King Naresuan the Great, a raft community, with delicious dried bananas as well as fantastic caves and waterfalls".

Geography

Location
The province is bordered to the north by Phichai District, Thong Saen Khan District and Nam Pat District of Uttaradit province and Lao People's Democratic Republic; to the east by Na Haeo District and Dan Sai District of Loei province, Khao Kho District and Wang Pong District of Phetchabun province; to the south by Wang Sai Phun District, Sak Lek District, Sam Ngam District and Mueang Phichit District of Phichit province; to the west by Lan Krabue District of Kamphaeng Phet province and Khiri Mat District and Kong Krailat District of Sukhothai province.

Topography

Climate

National parks

There are five national parks, along with five other national parks, make up region 11 of Thailand's protected areas.
 Thung Salaeng Luang National Park, 
 Namtok Chat Trakan National Park, 
 Phu Soi Dao National Park, 
 Phu Hin Rong Kla National Park, 
 Khwae Noi National Park,

Wildlife sanctuaries
There are two wildlife sanctuaries, along with four other wildlife sanctuaries, make up region 11 of Thailand's protected areas.
 Phu Miang–Phu Thong Wildlife Sanctuary, 
 Phu Khat Wildlife Sanctuary,

Religion

Buddhism
As of 2019 the population of Phitsanulok was 95% Buddhist with some 328 Buddhist temples and 272 samnak song (houses of monks that are not officially registered) in the province.

The other eight districts have the following numbers of temples and samnak song:

Christian
There are 50 Christian churches in Phitsanulok province.

Muslim
Muslims have their Masjid Abubak Pakistan mosque in Mueang Phitsanulok district.

Administrative divisions 
 
Phitsanulok province is divided into nine districts (amphoe). These are further subdivided into 93 subdistricts (tambon) and 1050 villages (muban).
As of 26 November 2019 for local government there are: one Phitsanulok Provincial Administrative Organisation - PPOA ( phitsanulok) and 26 municipal (thesaban) areas in the province. Phitsanulok has city (thesaban nakhon) status, Aranyik has town (thesaban mueang) status and 24 subdistrict municipalities (thesaban tambon). The non-municipal areas are administered by 76 Subdistrict Administrative Organisations - SAO (ongkan borihan suan tambon).

Demography

Population
The population of Phitsanulok province is 865,247, of which Mueang Phitsanulok district is the most populated with 291,311 people. Wang Thong district also has a population exceeding 100,000 people. The remaining seven districts have populations of 35,000 to 95,000, of which Wat Bot district is the least populated district with 37,694 people.

The population density of Phitsanulok province is 80 people per square kilometer (207 people per mile2), of which Mueang Phitsanulok District has the highest density with 388 people per km2 (1,005 people per mile2) and Chat Trakan District the lowest density with 26 people per km2 (68 people per mile2)

Urban areas
The urban population of Phitsanulok province is 274,802 (31.8%) There is one urban area, the city of Phitsanulok, with more than 150,000 inhabitants. The urban area around Bang Rakam has more than 30,000 people. There are also seven urban areas with 7,000 to 13,000 people. There are six urban areas with fewer than 5,500 people, of which Phrom Phiram is the smallest with about 1,100 people.See also: Phitsanulok Local Government

Municipal/non-municipal areas
Of the total population of Phitsanulok province, 31.8% live in municipal areas. In Mueang Phitsanulok district, this is 54.4% of the people. Between 30% and50% in three districts live in municipal areas. In two districts this is between 20–25%. Finally, it is less than 15% in three districts, with Wang Thong District having the lowest rate at 3.8%.

Age structure
At the beginning of the 21st century there are lower birth rates. There are more men then women up to 40 years, suggesting that slightly more boys than girls born each year. Above 40 years of age there are more women then men, which reflects the higher life expectancy of women.

Economy
In 2018, Phitsanulok province had an economic output of 100.286 billion baht (US$3.235 billion). This amounts to per capita gross provincial product (GPP) of 111,872 baht (US$3,609). The total workforce was 476,004 of which 199,292 (41.9%) were employed in agriculture and fishing and 276,712 (58.1%) were employed in non-agriculture.

Agriculture
Agricultural land use,  is 45.2% of total land of Phitsanulok province . This is divided as follows: paddy land:  58.2%, upland rice:  23.7%, orchard and perennial crop:  11.3%, vegetable and ornamental plant:  0.5% and farmland:  6.3%.

Agriculture in Phitsanulok province, the biggest sector of the economy, generated 28.029 billion baht (US$904 million) or 28% of GPP with a workforce of 199,292 (41.9% of all employed persons).

Production of the four main crops: sugarcane 1,620,173 tonnes; rice 1,284,164 tonnes; cassava 529,467 tonnes; and maize 255,898 tonnes.

Of the 54 sorts of vegetable crops, the twelve with the highest yield are: watermelon 6,452 tonnes; Chinese cabbage 3,671 tonnes; cabbage 2,332 tonnes; cucumber 1,495 tonnes; pumpkin 1,005 tonnes; bell pepper 983 tonnes; bird pepper 980 tonnes; ginger 892 tonnes; sweet corn 509 tonnes; bitter gourd 357 tonnes; lemon grass 283 tonnesand melon 236 tonnes.

Agricultural commodities produced in significant amounts include: pineapple 111,212 tonnes; para rubber 40,800 tonnes; mango 65,960 tonnesand banana (kluai numwa) 15,673 tonnes. Further there are: lime 2,147 tonnes; longan 1,436 tonnes; sweet banana 1,275 tonnes; tamarind 1,245 tonnes; pomelo 1,083 tonnes; rambutan 961 tonnes; sweet tamarind 900 tonnes; Indian mulberry 801 tonnes; marionberry 686 tonnes; plum mango 538 tonnesand jackfruit 340 tonnes.

Animal husbandry
Livestock produced included: cattle 48,100; chickens 2,809,362; ducks 642,182; swine 146,911; buffalo 16,022; goats 8,062; and geese 1,692.

Fisheries
Total catch from freshwater aquaculture was 12,169 tonnes: Wang Thong 3,650 tonnes; Bang Rakam 2,412 tonnes; Wat Bot 1,541 tonnes; Mueang Phitsanulok 1,144 tonnes; Nakhon Thai 1,007 tonnes; Phrom Phiram 990 tonnes; Noen Maprang 696 tonnes; Chat Trakan 566 tonnes; and Bang Krathum 159 tonnes.

Trade
Wholesale and retail trade; repair of motor vehicles and motorcycles, the second sector of the economy generated 1.897 billion baht (US$448 million) or 13.2% of GPP with a workforce of 62,685 (13.2%).

Hotel and restaurant
Hotels and restaurants contributed 1.025 billion baht (US$33 million) or one percent of GPP, with a workforce numbering 37,255 (7.8%).

Education
Phitsanulok province is the educational center of the lower northern region. There are many educational institutions at all levels, from kindergarten to university level, both government and private.

Higher education
There are six higher education institutes in the province with 38,553 students:
Naresuan University with 16 faculties, 184 courses and with more than 22,000 students is leader of the universities in Phitsanulok province.
Pibulsongkram Rajabhat University with 6 faculties.
Rajamangala University of Technology Lanna, campus Phitsanulok with 3 faculties.
Phitsanulok University, a private university with 5 faculties is the last with 174 students.
Sirindhorn College of Public Health Phitsanulok province.
Boromarajonani College of Nursing Buddhachinaraj.

Vocational education
Total seven vocational colleges with 11,023 students.

Secondary education
Total   41 upper secondary schools with 15,982 students.
Total 164 lower  secondary schools with 26,939 students.

Primary education
Total 256 primary schools with 52,508 pupils.

Healthcare

Government hospitals
There are thirteen government hospitals in Phitsanulok province with total 2,000 beds, of which Mueang Phitsanulok District has four hospitals:
Buddhachinaraj Phitsanulok Hospital is the provincial's and city's primary public hospital with 1,000 beds.
Naresuan University Hospital is the regional tertiary care hospital and a primary teaching hospital of Faculty of Medicine, Naresuan University.
Fort Somdet Phra Naresuan Maharat Hospital is the army hospital, which is open to the general public.
Royal Thai Air Force Wing 46 Hospital is the air force hospital, which is also open to the general public.
The other eight districts each have a hospital, Wang Thong District has two hospitals as an exception.

Private hospitals
Five private hospitals are in Mueang Phitsanulok District with 400 beds:
Bangkok Hospital Phitsanulok.
Phitsanulok Hospital.
Pitsanuvej Hospital.
Ruamphaet Hospital.
Radiotherapy and Nuclear Medicine Hospital.

Health promoting hospitals
There are total 147 health promoting hospitals, of which:
24 in Mueang Phitsanulok District
20 in Nakhon Thai District
12 in Chat Trakan District
20 in Bang Rakam District
13 in Bang Krathum District
19 in Phrom Phiram District
  9 in Wat Bot District
19 in Wang Thong District
11 in Noen Maprang District

Clinics
Around 412 clinics are in Phitsanulok province, of which 280 clinics (68%) in Mueang Phitsanulok province, 17 in Nakhon Thai, six in Chat Trakan, 17 in Bang Rakam, 12 in Bang Krathum, 29 in Phrom Phiram, 13 in Wat Bot, 25 in Wang Thong and 13 in Noen Maprang Districts.

Transport

Roads
There are five major roads in the province.
Highway 11 to the North:    Phitsanulok–Uttaradit–Lampang.
Highway 12 to the East:     Phitsanulok–Phetchabun–Khon Kaen–Mukdahan.
Highway 11 to the South:   Phitsanulok–Sing Buri.
Highway 117 to the South: Phitsanulok–Phichit–Nakhon Sawan.
Highway 12 to the West:    Phitsanulok–Sukhothai–Tak–Mae Sot.
They are all connected by Phitsanulok outer ring road 126 with viaducts.
East–West Economic Corridor (EWEC) is a transportation link along Myanmar–Thailand–Laos–Vietnam: Mawlamyine (Moulmein)–Myawaddy/Mae Sot–Phitsanulok–Khon Kaen–Mukdahan/Savannakhet–Dong Ha–Da Nang.

Motor vehicles

Autocars and motorcycles
Registered in 2019 under the "Motor Car Act":

Buses and trucks
Registered in 2019 under the "Land Transport Act":

Buses provide the mass transport throughout the province. Phitsanulok is connected from three bus terminals with Bangkok and the cities of the provinces of northern Thailand (except Mae Hong Son) and upper northeastern Thailand by daily and nightly, direct bus routes. All of these bus routes are provided by eight bus companies:
Sombat Tour.
Phet Prasert.
Esan Tour.
Wintour.
Kingdom Tour.
Nakhonchai Air.
Yanyon Tour.
Budsarakam Tour.
Phet Prasert operates also direct bus lines to eastern Thailand (Pattaya and Chantaburi).
Direct bus lines to southern Thailand (Phuket, Ko Samui, Phang Nga, Hat Yai and Surat Thani) are provided by Piya Chai Patthana.

Airlines

Railway

Public rail transport

Phitsanulok city has Phitsanulok railway station on the Northern Line of the State Railway of Thailand.
Intercity service runs from Hua Lamphong railway station of Bangkok - Ayutthaya - Nakhon Sawan - Phitsanulok - Lampang - Chiang Mai.
Commuter rail runs along the Northern Line.
In the year 2019, all tickets sold were 528,819.
204 first class one way tickets were sold.
Second class tickets were also sold for one way for a total of 85,374 (16.1%).
Third class tickets sold totaled 443,445 (83.9%).
One way third class tickets totaled 393,958 (74.5%).
Roundtrip third class tickets totaled 9,389 (1.8%).
Commuter third class tickets totaled 40,098 (7.6%).

Freight rail transport

A small portion of all freight in Phitsanulok province is transported by rail.

PTT Public Company Limited operates a crude oil depot adjacent to Bueng Phra railway station. SRT runs several oil freight services from this railway station to Mae Nam railway station in Chong Nonsi Subdistrict, Yan Nawa District, Bangkok.

Tourism
There were 6,403 hotel rooms in 2018; about 3,304,883 people of which 3,088,811 Thai (93.5%) and 216,072 foreigners (6.5%) visited Phitsanulok province and contributed 8.33 billion baht (US$268 million) to tourism revenues. Further explained: 1,999,391 tourists of which 1,838,692 Thai and 216,072 foreigners; 1,305,492 excursionists of which 1,205,119 Thai and 55,373 foreigners. Compared to the two previous years 2016 and 2017, the number of people increased by 6.3 and 5.4% respectively.

Infrastructure

Communications
As of 2018 there were 304,425 households, of which 6,726 (2.2%) used fixed telephones, 66,149 (21.7%) used computers without internet connection and 209,090 (68.7) used computers with internet connection.
As of 2018 there were 835,814 people aged six years and older, of which 227,325 (27.2%) used computers, 454,569 (54.4%) used the internet and 744,576 (89.1%) used mobile phones.

Electricity
In 2019, of the 347,266 households in Phitsanulok province 85.7% were connected to the electricity grid. All households of Bang Krathum District were connected, but for Noen Maprang District this was 69.9%.

Waterworks
Provincial Waterworks Authority (PWA) supplied tap water to 63,077 households of Phitsanulok province or 18.5%.

Mueang Phitsanulok District has 42,267 households (30.5%) connected to the water grid. Noen Maprang District has 526 households (2.4%) connected to the water grid. Almost every residential area has its own water tower connected to a drilled water source.

Human achievement index 2017

Since 2003, United Nations Development Programme (UNDP) in Thailand has tracked progress on human development at sub-national level using the Human achievement index (HAI), a composite index covering all the eight key areas of human development. National Economic and Social Development Board (NESDB) has taken over this task since 2017.

See also 

 Thai–Laotian Border War

References

External links 
Official site of Phitsanulok province

 
Provinces of Thailand